Arjun Singhwali is a village of Okara District in the Punjab province of Pakistan. It is located in the east of the district near the Indian border at 30°46'50N 74°11'0E with an altitude of 180 metres (593 feet).

References

Villages in Okara District